The Terre Haute, Indianapolis and Eastern Traction Company, or THI&E, was the second largest interurban in the U.S. state of Indiana at the 1920s height of the "interurban era." The THI&E was formed in 1907 by the Schoepf-McGowan Syndicate as a combination of several predecessor interurban and street car companies and was operated independently until incorporation into the Indiana Railroad in 1931. The THI&E served a wide range of territory, including farmlands in central Indiana, the mining region around Brazil, and numerous urban centers. Eventually, it slowly succumbed like all of the other central Indiana interurban lines, to competition from automobiles, trucks, and improved paralleling highways.

Consolidation

On March 1, 1907, financiers Hugh J. McGowan, Randal Morgan and W. Kesley Schoepf formed the THI&E out of four predecessor companies: the Indianapolis and Western Railway, which operated the line from Indianapolis west to Danville; the Indianapolis and Eastern Railway, with lines from Indianapolis east to Dublin and from Dunreith to New Castle; the Richmond Street and Interurban Railway, with the line in eastern Indiana from Dublin to Richmond; and the Indianapolis Coal Traction Company. Three weeks later the THI&E acquired the Terre Haute Traction and Light Company, which operated a line from Terre Haute south to Sullivan, north to Clinton, Indiana, and west to Paris, Illinois. The final major piece of the THI&E was the 1912 addition of the Indianapolis Crawfordsville and Danville Electric Railway, nicknamed the "Ben Hur Route" in honor of Lew Wallace of Crawfordsville, author of the novel "Ben Hur." It also turned out to be one of the financially weakest due to its many unproductive branch lines.

Operations

The THI&E was a very typical Midwestern interurban line, operating six far-reaching lines out of Indianapolis to mostly small and midsized prairie cities using large and heavy wood combines like the one pictured.  Tracks and right-of-way quality varied. Some track ran tightly adjacent to a steam railroad, some track ran cross country and was very substantial featuring expensive cut-and-fill construction to provide a direct and flat right of way, and some was meandering side of a country road and went up and down with the road and the terrain plus would occasionally jog from one side of the road to the other depending on how uncooperative a farmer had been when the line was constructed. The THI&E's busier lines had color signal block protection which was rare at the time. Many interurbans, including the other major Indiana interurbans and in particular Union Traction, suffered major wrecks as the result of  few or no block signals. Most THI&E passenger service was hourly, and main routes also saw package express service. THI&E's limited stop express to Terre Haute from Indianapolis was named the "Highlander." The "Ben Hur Special" ran to Crawfordsville, and the "Tecumseh Arrow" ran to Lafayette. Eventually the most valuable route in terms of both passenger and freight business, its eastward to Richmond line, connected to the Dayton and Western at Richmond, and the two companies combined for a profitable and busy Indianapolis to Dayton service. In the 1920s, the two ran express passenger service between the two large cities, and the freight interchanged from Ohio interurbans by way of the Dayton and Western became financially very important. The THI&E was never prosperous enough to replace its aging fleet of wood interurban cars,. but many were modernized. Much of the THI&E's various town streetcar lines were eventually equipped with new one-man Birney streetcars. The THI&E used the huge Indianapolis Traction Terminal along with its neighboring Indianapolis interurban companies.

Absorption into Indiana Railroad

The THI&E was perhaps the financially weakest line of the great Indiana interurbans. During the prosperous 1920s, its consistent operating deficits were offset only by the sale of power from its coal driven power plants and by the profits of the Indianapolis Street Railway, a subsidiary company.  The onset of the Depression added to its woes, and the THI&E went into "operating" bankruptcy called Receivership, where it would continue to operate but not be obligated to pay interest on its bonded debt on April 2, 1930.  At this time Samuel Insull's Midland Utilities was in the process of consolidating most of the major Indiana interurbans (Indiana Service Corporation, Interstate Public Service, Union Traction, Northern Indiana Power, and the THI&E) into the new Indiana Railroad. The unprofitable branch lines that made up much of the THI&E did not fit into Insull's master plan, and they were abandoned. The busy west-east Terre Haute through Indianapolis to Richmond line survived, but the Danville, Martinsville, Lafayette and Crawfordsville branches were abandoned on October 31, 1930. The Sullivan and Clinton lines were abandoned early the next year. In June 1931, Midland Utilities absorbed the THI&E into its Indiana Railroad. Track and facilities were improved, and THI&E's large wood passenger combines (passenger+freight in one car) replaced with new lightweight fast passenger cars. Some of the old wood cars became freight box motors. The last of this former THI&E line was abandoned in 1940, and the Indiana Railroad itself abandoned all operations in 1941.

The essential Dayton and Western connection

The THI&E, in 1930 now the Indiana Railroad, and the Dayton and Western interurban tied together at Richmond, Indiana. The two lines combined their equipment to run direct no car change passenger service from Indianapolis to Dayton, Ohio As pasennger businees diminished, the two line's freight business picked up, and for the Indiana Railraod the Dayton and Western was essential for moving freight to Dayton and to the rest of Ohio, particularly to industrial Toledo and Cleveland. When the Dayton and Western went bankrupt in 1937, it was a big financial blow to the Indiana Railroad and its Ohio freight interchange partner at Richmond, the Cincinnati and Lake Erie Railroad. Both the IR and the C&LE ceased operations within a few years.

References and notes

Bibliography

External links
  THI&E and Indiana Railroad photos from Dave's Electric Railroads site.
  THI&E photos from Don Ross' Rail Photos
  Indiana Railroad Society historical articles and maps regarding Indiana interurban lines.

Defunct Indiana railroads
Interurban railways in Indiana
Defunct Illinois railroads
Interurban railways in Illinois